Live at the Electric Factory is the first live CD from Denver-based rock band the Fray, available on iTunes as well as at select indie stores.  It was recorded at the Electric Factory in Philadelphia and released on July 18, 2006.

Track listing

 "How To Save A Life" – 4:41
 "She Is" – 4:16
 "All at Once" – 4:02
 "Chips and Salsa" - :36
 "Heaven Forbid" – 4:17
 "Interlude I" - :48
 "Vienna" – 5:31
 "Dead Wrong" – 3:32
 "It's Not Easy Being Skinny" - :36
 "Over My Head (Cable Car)" – 4:20
 "Interlude II" - :25
 "Look After You" – 7:27
 "Trust Me" – 13:32

References

The Fray albums
2006 live albums